Heckmondwike is a village and an unparished area in the metropolitan borough of Kirklees, West Yorkshire, England.  Heckmondwike ward contains 19 listed buildings that are recorded in the National Heritage List for England.  Of these, two are listed at Grade II*, the middle of the three grades, and the others are at Grade II, the lowest grade.  The listed buildings include houses, churches, a former chapel and associated structures, a public house, a Masonic hall, cemetery buildings, a drinking fountain and clock tower, a bank, a former Sunday school, a shop, and a pair of telephone kiosks.


Key

Buildings

References

Citations

Sources

Lists of listed buildings in West Yorkshire
Listed